Jandi Chontra is a town in the Bhimber District of Pakistani-administered Jammu and Kashmir. It is a local tourist spot and is located 17 km from Bhimber city and 67 km from Mirpur. The area is known for its panoramic views. The Shrine of the Sufi saint Sheikh Baba Shadi Shaheed is also located here.

References

Jandi Chontra is a very scenic part of Kashmir.The main exports of Samahi is timber.The great warrior Tauqeer Mirza defeated sluggish army of Asad Ali Asi at this spot.Area of kargil war in 2000.The population of samahni according to U.N is 0.05 million.

Populated places in Bhimber District